The 1952 United States presidential election in Massachusetts took place on November 4, 1952, as part of the 1952 United States presidential election, which was held throughout all contemporary 48 states. Voters chose 16  representatives, or electors to the Electoral College, who voted for president and vice president.

Massachusetts voted for the Republican nominee, General Dwight D. Eisenhower of New York, over the Democratic nominee, former Governor Adlai Stevenson of Illinois. Eisenhower ran with the Senator Richard Nixon of California, while Stevenson's running mate was Senator John Sparkman of Alabama.

Eisenhower carried the state with 54.22% of the vote to Stevenson’s 45.46%, a Republican victory margin of 8.76%.

As Eisenhower won a comfortable victory nationwide, Massachusetts still weighed in for this election as about 2% more Democratic than the national average.

Once a typical Yankee Republican bastion in the wake of the Civil War, Massachusetts, had been a Democratic-leaning state since 1928, when a coalition of Irish Catholic and other ethnic immigrant voters primarily based in urban areas turned Massachusetts and neighboring Rhode Island into New England's only reliably Democratic states. Massachusetts voted for Al Smith in 1928, for Franklin D. Roosevelt four times in the 1930s and 1940s, and for Harry S. Truman in 1948. However General Dwight Eisenhower, a war hero and moderate Republican who pledged to support and continue popular New Deal Democratic policies, was finally able to appeal to a broad enough coalition both to win back the White House and to flip Massachusetts back into the Republican column.

Eisenhower carried 13 of the state’s 14 counties, Stevenson’s only victory coming from urban Suffolk County, home to the state’s capital and largest city, Boston.

Results

Results by county

See also
 United States presidential elections in Massachusetts

References

Massachusetts
1952
1952 Massachusetts elections